David Taylor Irvine,  (10 January 1947 – 30 March 2022) was an Australian diplomat who, from March 2009 to September 2014, was the Director-General of Security, the head of the Australian Security Intelligence Organisation (ASIO). Prior to his appointment to ASIO, he was Director-General of the Australian Secret Intelligence Service (ASIS) from 2003 to 2009. In 2017 he was appointed Chair of the Foreign Investment Review Board.

Education and career
Irvine was born in Perth, Western Australia, and studied at Hale School and the University of Western Australia, graduating with honours in Elizabethan history. He worked as a journalist in Perth, and joined the Department of External Affairs (the Australian foreign service) in 1970, and serving as a diplomat in Rome (1970–1973) later in Jakarta (1976–1980). Other diplomatic appointments included postings as a Counsellor (later Minister) in Beijing (1982–1986) and Minister in Jakarta (1988–1990).  In 1996 to 1999 Irvine served as Australian High Commissioner to Papua New Guinea, and was Australian Ambassador to China from 2000 to 2003.

Irvine wrote two books about Indonesia: a 1990 English translation of Bisma: Warrior Priest of the Mahabharata by Satyagraha Hurip, and Leather Gods & Wooden Heroes: Java's Classical Wayang (1996; about Indonesian Wayang shadow puppets). 

Irvine died in Canberra on 30 March 2022 after a period of illness and a stroke, aged 75.

Honours
Irvine was appointed an Officer of the Order of Australia in June 2005.

References

1947 births
2022 deaths
Directors-General of Security
Directors-General of the Australian Secret Intelligence Service
Officers of the Order of Australia
University of Western Australia alumni
People educated at Hale School
People from Perth, Western Australia
High Commissioners of Australia to Papua New Guinea
Ambassadors of Australia to China
Ambassadors of Australia to Mongolia
21st-century Australian public servants
20th-century Australian public servants